Michal Kohút (born 4 June 2000) is a Czech football player. He plays for Slovácko.

Club career
He made his professional Czech National Football League debut for Pardubice on 26 July 2019 in a game against Zbrojovka Brno.

He made his Czech First League debut for Slovácko on 8 March 2020 in a game against Teplice.

References

External links

2000 births
Living people
Czech footballers
Czech Republic youth international footballers
Czech Republic under-21 international footballers
Association football midfielders
FK Pardubice players
1. FC Slovácko players
Czech First League players
Czech National Football League players